One Time Out is the fifth album by Paul Motian on the Italian Soul Note label. It was released in 1989 and features performances by Motian’s trio with guitarist Bill Frisell and tenor saxophonist Joe Lovano.

Reception
The Allmusic review by Scott Yanow awarded the album 4 stars, stating: "it is the basic sound of the unique group that makes the CD of great interest".

Track listing
 "One Time Out" - 5:48
 "If You Could See Me Now" (Dameron, Sigman) - 5:25  
 "For the Love of Sarah" - 4:23  
 "The Storyteller" - 5:04  
 "Portrait of T." - 5:06  
 "Morpion" - 5:54
 "Monk's Mood" (Monk) - 7:34
 "Good Idea" - 4:22
 "Circle Dance" - 5:43

All compositions by Paul Motian except as indicated
Recorded 21–22 September 1987 at Barigozzi Studio, Milano

Personnel
Paul Motian - drums
Bill Frisell - electric guitar
Joe Lovano - tenor saxophone

References

1989 albums
Paul Motian albums
Black Saint/Soul Note albums